Monroe Township is one of the seventeen townships of Logan County, Ohio, United States. As of the 2010 census, the population was 1,739, up from 1,503 at the 2000 census.

Geography
Located in the south-eastern part of the county, it borders the following townships:
Jefferson Township – north
Perry Township – northeast corner
Zane Township – east
Wayne Township, Champaign County – southeast
Salem Township, Champaign County – south
Liberty Township – west

Parts of the villages of West Liberty and Valley Hi are located in southwestern and northern Monroe Township respectively, and the unincorporated community of Pickrelltown lies in the township's north.

Name and history
Monroe Township was organized in 1822. It is one of twenty-two Monroe Townships statewide.

Government
The township is governed by a three-member board of trustees, who are elected in November of odd-numbered years to a four-year term beginning on the following January 1. Two are elected in the year after the presidential election and one is elected in the year before it. There is also an elected township fiscal officer, who serves a four-year term beginning on April 1 of the year after the election, which is held in November of the year before the presidential election. Vacancies in the fiscal officership or on the board of trustees are filled by the remaining trustees.

In the elections of November 2007, Dale Barns and Linda Stuart were elected without opposition to the positions of township trustee and township fiscal officer respectively.

Transportation
Important highways in Monroe Township include State Routes 245 and 287.

References

External links
County website
County and township map of Ohio
Detailed Logan County map

Townships in Logan County, Ohio
Townships in Ohio
1822 establishments in Ohio
Populated places established in 1822